Patricia Donnelly Harris (October 30, 1919 – October 25, 2009) was Miss America in 1939.

Early years
Born Patricia Mary Donnelly in Durand, Michigan, she was a singer in grade school and on radio programs, and she began singing with a band soon after she finished high school. She also worked as a model for Hudson's department store.

Miss America
Donnelly was the last to be crowned at the Steel Pier. In the talent competition, she sang the then-new ballad "To You" and the faster-tempo "Old Man Mose". After winning the Miss America title, she traveled across the United States making personal appearances. She was given the nickname "The Long-Stemmed American Beauty".

Career 
Following her reign as Miss America, Donnelly sang at the Stork Club, on Broadway, and appeared in some films. She worked for the John Robert Powers modeling agency. Her Broadway credits included the musical revue Priorities of 1942 and the musical comedy The Lady Comes Across (1942).

En route to Chicago on the famous "Super Chief" of railways, she was introduced to Jack Warner of Warner Brothers Studio. He recognized her strong resemblance to Hollywood beauty, Ann Sheridan.

Soon a Hollywood contract was offered, but Donnelly turned it down.  "I realized by that time I didn't want my face known," she said.  "In other words, I wanted the freedom of movement, to go where I pleased without people knowing who I was."

Personal life 
Donnelly married Robin Harris in 1948 and had two children, Amanda and Stephen. For years she and Robin worked together as travel editors of the Hearst Newspapers.

In 1980, she was diagnosed with throat cancer after years of smoking cigarettes. She underwent a laryngectomy, she spoke with the aid of a prosthesis.

Donnelly died on October 25, 2009, at the age of 89.

References 
 

1919 births
2009 deaths
Miss America 1930s delegates
Miss America winners
People from Detroit